Andrea Černá is a Czech theatrical and television actress, born 13 February 1977 in Karlovy Vary. She studied at the Prague Conservatory.

Filmography 
Pátá žena (2008)
10 způsobů (2007)
Slečna Guru (2006)
Kameňák 2 (2003)
"Strážce duší" (2005) TV seriál (episode)
Věrní abonenti (2001) ... Petra
Prima sezóna (1994) TV seriál (episode ??? 1995)
Princezna ze mlejna 2 ... Eliška
Čerte, tady straší (1998)
Pohádka z větrného mlýna (1996)
Princezna ze mlejna (1994) ... Eliška

Theatre

Divadlo J. K. Tyla, Plzeň 
Celebrity s.r.o. ... Adéla
Moon Over Buffalo ... Rosalind
Přes přísný zákaz dotýká se sněhu ... Ester Kožená
Věrní abonenti ... Petra
Ještě jednou, pane profesore ... Nataša
David and Goliath ... Růžena
Maska a tvář ... Sarina
Some Girl(s) ... Taylor
Hamlet ... Ophelia
Nuly ... Elvira
Queen Margo ... Markéta
Drobečci z perníkut ... Polly
Arthur´s Bolero ... Anna
Gazdina roba ... Zuzka
Rostandovo novoromantické drama ... Roxana

Another Stage Works 
Three Sisters .... ??? (Divadlo Na Fidlovačce, Prague)
Servant of Masters .... ??? (Jindřichohradecká činohra)

External links 
J. K. Tyl Theatre (in Czech)
Andrea Černá on the Osobnosti.cz (in Czech)
 

1977 births
Living people
Czech stage actresses
Czech television actresses
Actors from Karlovy Vary
Prague Conservatory alumni
20th-century Czech actresses
21st-century Czech actresses